The Ridgefield Press is an American weekly newspaper published each Thursday for Ridgefield, Connecticut. The newspaper was established in 1875, and has a paid circulation of about 4,753 copies.

It is currently owned by Hearst Media, which publishes the Press and seven other weekly newspapers Fairfield County, Connecticut and Westchester County, New York.

The fictitious film critic David Manning was supposedly writing for The Ridgefield Press.

References

External links
 

Newspapers published in Connecticut
Ridgefield, Connecticut
Publications established in 1875
Mass media in Fairfield County, Connecticut